Brian Lynch may refer to:

 Brian Lynch (basketball) (born 1978), American basketball player
 Brian Lynch (musician) (born 1956), American jazz trumpeter
 Brian Lynch (public servant) (born 1936), New Zealander public servant
 Brian Lynch (writer) (born 1973), American film and comic book writer
 Brian Lynch (Irish writer) (born 1945), Irish writer of poetry, plays, and fiction